The Rider of the Law is a 1935 American Western film directed by Robert N. Bradbury.

Plot summary

Cast 
 Bob Steele as Bob Marlow
 Gertrude Messinger as Ann Carver
 Si Jenks as Buffalo Brady
 Lloyd Ingraham as Colonel Carver
 John Elliott as Town Mayor
 Earl Dwire as Razor Tolliver
 Forrest Taylor as Gambler
 Jack Kirk as Jake Tolliver

See also
 Bob Steele filmography

External links 
 
 

1935 films
1935 Western (genre) films
American Western (genre) films
American black-and-white films
1930s English-language films
Films directed by Robert N. Bradbury
1930s American films